Grand Rapids is a city in the U.S. state of Michigan.

Grand Rapids may also refer to:

Places
In Canada: 
 Grand Rapids, Manitoba
 Grand Rapids (Athabasca River)
 Grand Rapids, British Columbia

In the United States:
 Grand Rapids metropolitan area, Michigan
 Grand Rapids, Minnesota
 Grand Rapids, North Dakota
 Grand Rapids, Ohio, a village in Wood County
 Grand Rapids, Wisconsin, a town in Wood County
 The city of Wisconsin Rapids, Wisconsin, also in Wood County, formerly named Grand Rapids

Railroads
 Grand Rapids, Grand Haven and Muskegon Railway
 Grand Rapids, Newaygo and Lake Shore Railroad
 Grand Rapids and Indiana Railroad

Transportation
 USS Grand Rapids (PF-31)
 USS Grand Rapids (PG-98)

Music

See also
 Grand Rapids Township (disambiguation)